Ohev Sholom (or Ohave/Ohaveth Shalom/Sholem/Sholum) ( "Lover of Peace"), may refer to the following synagogues:

Canada
 Congregation Beth Israel Ohev Sholem (Quebec City, Quebec)

United States
 Ohev Sholem Synagogue (New London, Connecticut)
 Ohev Sholom - The National Synagogue (Washington, D.C.)
 Ohev Sholom Talmud Torah Congregation of Olney (Olney, Maryland)
 Congregation Ohev Shalom (Marlboro, New Jersey)
 Ohave Shalom Synagogue (Woodbridge, New York)
 Temple Ohev Sholom (Harrisburg, Pennsylvania)
 Congregation Ohev Shalom (Wallingford, Pennsylvania)
 Ohaveth Sholum Congregation, (Seattle, Washington)
 Ohev Sholom Temple (Huntington, West Virginia)